Germany has the second-largest video games market in Europe, with 44.3 million gamers in 2018, after Russia. Consumers in Germany spent €4.4 billion on video games over the course of 2018, a 9 percent year-on-year increase from 2017. The video game market in Germany grew by 6 percent to €6.2 billion ($6.7 billion) in 2019.

The annual Gamescom in Cologne is the world's largest video game expo by number of attendees.

Home production

Origins
German production of popular video-games began principally on the 16-bit systems such as the Commodore Amiga and Atari ST in the 1980s, although a number of successful titles were also released on the Commodore 64 which dominated the 8-bit computer market in the country at the time. Popular developers of the 16-bit era included Thalion, Factor 5 (who were responsible for developing the entire Turrican series) and Blue Byte. Blue Byte and Factor 5 remain in existence in 2006 and produce titles for Windows PCs.

Modern day
By 2002, German games were heavily tilted toward construction and management simulations, according Der Spiegels Frank Patalong. He noted that "nowhere else in the world are simulations as successful as here at home. Titles such as The Settlers, Die Völker [and] Anno 1602 have dominated the German sales charts for years". Released in 1998, Anno 1602 by Sunflowers Interactive was Germany's best-selling computer game of all time as of December 2002, with sales of 2.5 million copies worldwide and 1.7 million in the German market. Its sequel, Anno 1503, broke its sales record to become Germany's fastest full-price computer game to reach 500,000 domestic sales. It ultimately sold over one million units in German-speaking countries, and, when combined with its predecessor, reached 4.5 million sales worldwide by October 2006. The titles began the Anno series.

One of the most famed titles to come out of Germany is Far Cry by Frankfurt-based Crytek, who also produced Crysis. Factor 5 had been concentrating on the Star Wars: Rogue Squadron series of video games from 1999 until 2003, and released Lair, an action game for the PlayStation 3, in 2007.

Ascaron produced the Elite homage Darkstar One, and continued to produce the popular  ( 'Kickoff') series of football games, the first two installations of which were released under the title On the Ball in English-speaking countries.

The German Government, as a part of the Gamescom fair, has introduced an investment programme aimed towards the countrywide online games industry, with a purpose to offer assistance of as much as 50% of the cost of development.

Companies

Game developers from Germany

Former studios

Co-development

Game publishers from Germany

Former publishers

Games

Popular titles from Germany
 Ambermoon
 Ankh
 Anstoss
 Anno series
 AquaNox series
 BeamNG
 CrossCode
 Crysis series
 Elex series
 Far Cry
 FIFA Manager series
 Gothic series
 Katakis
 Knights and Merchants: The Shattered Kingdom
 Might and Magic series (eg. X)
 Heroes of Might and Magic series (eg. VI & VII series)
 Risen series
 Sacred_(video_game)
 Spec Ops: The Line
 SpellForce series
 The Great Giana Sisters
 The Settlers series
 Tropico series (eg. #6 series)
 Turrican
 X series

Consumption
Within Germany there is a popular taste for historical trade and warfare simulations, notably exceeding that of many other countries. Some German-developed titles in this genre, such as 1602 A.D. and its sequels, and The Patrician, have also been successful abroad.

Vehicle simulator games are also very popular in Germany. Many add-on developers for established simulator franchises, including Train Simulator and Microsoft Flight Simulator, are based in Germany, with one of the most popular, Aerosoft, being based in North Rhine-Westphalia.

First-person shooters have also been traditionally quite popular in recent years, and there has been considerable debate about and censorship of the violent content of many such games.  Consequently these games, especially uncut versions, became highly coveted in gaming circles for many years (though the modern Internet and VPNs allow players virtually anywhere to obtain a game from, or play on a server hosted in, virtually any other jurisdiction today).

Trade fairs

From 2002 to 2008 the main video game trade fair in Germany was the Games Convention which was held annually in Leipzig, and was highly recognized by the press. Since 2009 it was discontinued, as the Gamescom in Cologne took the place of the major video game trade fair in the world.

The USK, BPjM and censorship

Violence in video games is a controversial subject in Germany, and German localisations of violent games are often heavily cut by the publishers to permit a public release. Usually this entails a simple removal or reduction of depictions of blood and gore, but often extends to cuts in the content or plot of the game, as was the case in Phantasmagoria, Phantasmagoria: A Puzzle of Flesh, Counter-Strike, Grand Theft Auto, Wolfenstein: The New Order, and South Park: The Stick of Truth.

All games that are released to the public are required to carry a certificate given by the USK ( – Voluntary Monitoring Organisation of Entertainment Software). If the USK has not issued a label, a game may be placed upon the "index" of media harmful to youth kept by the BPjM (Federal Department for Media Harmful to Young Persons). This results, at least, in a ban on promoting the game in any way and strict requirements for age checks. As prosecutors are inconsistent on whether reviews are a form of promotion this creates a chilling effect on games journalism for the affected titles. The strict requirements for age checks frequently lead to a game being taken off the market entirely, or only being made available in a cut version even for adults, due to economic considerations by developers/publishers. Independently, courts may also issue confiscation orders against games deemed to be especially egregious, resulting in an outright ban.

The 2003 changes to the  also announced an intent to extend the restrictions on the depiction of violence in video games, leaving open the possibility of banning any depiction of violence in video games, which was met by widespread outcry from the video game community in Germany. The then in power CDU/SPD coalition government announced an intention to enact this in 2005, but in November 2006 such restrictions were not enacted at that time.

See also

Notes

References